Bikram Singh may refer to:
 Bikram Singh, Raja of Saraikela; see List of state leaders in 1620
 Bikram Singh (lieutenant general) (1911-1963), Indian Army general who was killed in the 1963 Poonch Indian Air Force helicopter crash
 K. Bikram Singh (1938–2013), Indian filmmaker and politician
 Bikram Singh (general) (born 1952), former Chief of Army Staff of Indian Army
 Bikram Singh (politician), Cabinet Minister from Himachal Pradesh
 Bikram Singh (musician) (born  1980), American bhangra music artist

See also
 Mohan Bikram Singh (born 1935), Nepalese politician
 Bikram Singh Majithia (born 1975), Punjabi Indian politician
 Bikram (disambiguation)